The first season of the television comedy series Mom aired between September 23, 2013, and April 14, 2014, on CBS in the United States. The season was produced by Chuck Lorre Productions and Warner Bros. Television, with series creators Chuck Lorre, Eddie Gorodetsky and Gemma Baker serving as executive producer.

The series follows Christy Plunkett (Anna Faris), a 35-year-old single mother who—after dealing with her battle with alcoholism and drug addiction—decides to restart her life in Napa, California's wine country working as a waitress at the restaurant Rustic Fig and attending Alcoholics Anonymous meetings. Her 51-year-old mother Bonnie Plunkett (Allison Janney) is also a recovering drug and alcohol addict, as well as her 17-year-old daughter Violet (Sadie Calvano), who was born when Christy was 17, has become pregnant by her boyfriend Luke (Spencer Daniels). Christy also has a younger son Roscoe (Blake Garrett Rosenthal) by her ex-husband Baxter (Matt Jones), a deadbeat drug-dealer. Other prominent characters in the series include the manager of Rustic Fig, Gabriel (Nate Corddry) and the head chef, Rudy (French Stewart). The episodes are usually titled with two odd topics that are mentioned in that episode. Season one of Mom consisted of 22 episodes and aired Mondays in the United States at 9.30 p.m. after Mike & Molly.

The series received average ratings of 8.34 million viewers, placing it as the number 42 most watched show of the television season. Allison Janney won the Primetime Emmy Award for Outstanding Supporting Actress in a Comedy Series at the 66th Primetime Emmy Awards for her performance as Bonnie Plunkett, and the series was also nominated for a People's Choice Award for Favorite New Comedy. Mom was renewed for a second season to premiere in the 2014–15 television season.

Cast

Main
 Anna Faris as Christy Plunkett
 Allison Janney as Bonnie Plunkett
 Sadie Calvano as Violet Plunkett
 Nate Corddry as Gabriel
 Matt Jones as Baxter
 French Stewart as Chef Rudy
 Spencer Daniels as Luke
 Blake Garrett Rosenthal as Roscoe

Recurring
 Reggie De Leon as Paul
 Mimi Kennedy as Marjorie Armstrong
 Kevin Pollak as Alvin Lester Biletnikoff
 Octavia Spencer as Regina Tompkins 
 Ryan Cartwright as Jeff Taylor
 Melissa Tang as Suzanne Taylor
 Courtney Henggeler as Claudia
 Don McManus as Steve Casper
 Mary Pat Gleason as Mary

Special guest stars
 Jon Cryer as himself
 Lisa Joyner as herself
 Justin Long as Adam Henchy

Guest stars
 David de Lautour as Greg
 George Paez as Ramone
 Matt Cook as Geoff
 Jim Holmes as Wayne
 Nick Searcy as Nathan
 Lauren Bowles as Mary
 Matt Roth as Jerry
 Jordan Dunn as Jackie Biletnikoff
 Nicholas Stockdale as Douglas Biletnikoff
 Nick Zano as David
 Tiffany Dupont as Alicia
 Rizwan Manji as Dr. Bellin
 Alex Desert as Wes
 Wayne Wilderson as Dr. Butler

Episodes

Ratings

References

External links
Episode recaps at CBS.com
 at Internet Movie Database

Mom (TV series)
2013 American television seasons
2014 American television seasons